The Memon are a Muslim community in Gujarat India, and Sindh, Pakistan, the majority of whom follow the Hanafi fiqh of Sunni Islam. They are divided into different groups based on their origins: Kathiawari Memons, Kutchi Memons and Bantva Memons from the Kathiawar, Kutch and Bantva regions of Gujarat respectively, and Sindhi Memons from Sindh.

Memons have cultural similarities with the Khoja, Bohra, and other Gujarati peoples. They speak the Memoni language as their first language, which shares vocabulary with the Sindhi language, Kutchi language and Gujarati languages.

Today, the Memon people are connected through globally recognized organisations such as the World Memon Organisation (WMO) and International Memon orgnisation (IMO).

History

Sindhi, Gujarati origins 

Memon lineage traces back to Lohanas of Lahore and Sindh, who practiced Hinduism. The origin of the name comes from Mu'min ("believer" in Arabic) and later evolved to present name Memon. The Memon community was founded in the 15th century by 700 families comprising 6,178 persons total. According to Anthovan, those Lohanas of Thatta who converted from Hinduism to Islam became Memons and were invited by Rao Khengarji Jadeja, ruler of Bhuj in the 16th century, to settle in Bhuj. It is from there that Kutchi Memons migrated to Kathiawar and mainland Gujarat. Surat in Gujarat was an important trading centre from 1580 to 1680 and Memons made their bounty there. Memons became significantly affluent as a result of trading in Surat.

Merchant tradesman 

Due to the mercantile nature of the community, Memons began a significant migration beyond the borders of India in the 18th and 19th centuries. This led to communities developing in the Middle East, South Africa, Sri Lanka and East Asia. Memon traders set up a network of joint stock companies acting in coordination with other members in an area ranging from Central Africa to China. Memon donors made significant financial contributions to construct mosques during this time, including Juma Masjid Mosque and Jamia Mosque. By late 19th century several thousand Memons had settled in Mumbai due to trading. Memon representative leaders traded with British capitalists to develop their Indian monopolies. The area of Mumbai in which the Memon traders congregated later became known as the Memonwada.

20th century 
The early 20th century saw a consolidation of the Memon community in South Asia as well as South Africa. They began to organise important societies including Memon Education and Welfare Society and Memon Chamber of Commerce. Memon community made significant financial contributions to preserve the Ottoman Empire but were unable to prevent its decline. The partition of Pakistan and India led to significant migration in both directions for the community. During middle of the twentieth century, a handful of Memon financial dynasties were born. However, the dynastic wealth of the Memon families stagnated during the late twentieth century due to the partition of Pakistan as well as political turmoil of the country.

Branches

Subgroups of Memons from Kathiawar

Languages

Social structure

Cultural traditions

While Memons are generally Sunni Muslims, many continue to follow Modern Hindu law in matters regarding property inheritance, community leadership structure and mutual support for members. Memon see themselves to be from the Buddhist Kshatriya lineage. Even within Memons, there are caste hierarchies that some follow regarding marriage practices.

According to folklore, the blessings of the Islamic saint Sayad Kadiri upon the Memons are responsible for their success in business and trade. A more pragmatic explanation for their success is that Memon have been historically considered honest brokers. Following commercial caste model, Memons also offer support community members in financial matters by giving loans and offering business assistance. The community annually celebrates 11 April as "Memons Day" through acts of humanitarian service.

Memons worldwide

Today, Memon communities are scattered throughout the world including the United Arab Emirates, Saudi Arabia, Sri Lanka, South Africa, the United Kingdom, the United States and Canada. However, major concentrations of Memon remain located in Karachi, Pakistan and Gujarat, India. In Karachi there is a community of Memon people from Bantva and their descendants known as Bantva Memons. United under the banner of Halari Memon General Jama'at, the Halari Memon are another category and followers of the Hanafi school.

Memons were also one of three classes living in South Africa when Mahatma Gandhi went there in 1893, Memons were traders serving the Indian diaspora in South Africa. Memons are known for their involvement in business and philanthropy, with Memons having played a major part in the building of Pakistani industry.

See also
List of Memon people

References

External links

Muhajir communities
Muslim communities of India
Social groups of Pakistan
Muslim communities of Gujarat
Sindhi tribes in India
Lohana